Arany Galushka (or Aranygaluska) is a traditional Hungarian dessert consisting of  balls of yeast dough (galuska). The balls are rolled in melted butter, and then rolled in a mixture of sugar and crushed nuts (traditionally, walnuts), assembled into layers, before being baked till golden.  Arany means gold or golden; galuska refers to the dumpling nature of the balls of dough. Aranygaluska may be served with vanilla custard.

Nancy Reagan popularized this dish in the United States when she served it at the White House for Christmas.

Related desserts
Somloi Galuska bears similarity to an English trifle. Its galuska (dumplings) are made of sponge cake, which are layered with vanilla custard, chocolate sauce, raisins, and rum. It may be garnished with whipped cream.

See also
 Buchteln
 Hungarian cuisine
 Monkey bread

References

External links
http://www.food.com/recipe/hungarian-golden-dumpling-coffee-cake-aranygaluska-162045
https://web.archive.org/web/20101122072422/http://desszert.eu/aranygaluska
 http://receptvideok.hu/recipe/aranygaluska/

Ashkenazi Jewish cuisine
Cakes
Hungarian cuisine
Purim foods
Nut dishes
Custard desserts
Hungarian confectionery